

Films

References

LGBT
1991 in LGBT history
1991